Big Wave Bay or Tai Long Wan is a bay in the Southern District of Hong Kong. It is located on the eastern coast of Hong Kong Island, south of Cape Collinson and north of Shek O. This bay should not be confused with the bay with the same name in Sai Kung.

Features
Big Wave Bay has a beach popular among surfers. It is also the site of a prehistoric rock carving, which is a declared monument.

Tai Long Wan Village is located nearby.

Education
Tai Long Wan is in Primary One Admission (POA) School Net 16. Within the school net are multiple aided schools (operated independently but funded with government money) and two government schools: Shau Kei Wan Government Primary School and Aldrich Bay Government Primary School.

See also
 Big Wave Bay Beach
 Hong Kong Trail
 Shek O Country Park
 Dragon's Back

References

External links

 Big Wave Bay. Beach water quality on Environmental Protection Department website

Bays of Hong Kong
Southern District, Hong Kong

Villages in Southern District, Hong Kong